Goodfellowiella coeruleoviolacea is a bacterium from the family Pseudonocardiaceae which has been isolated from soil in Russia.

References

Pseudonocardiales
Bacteria described in 1987